Lenawee County Board of Health v. Messerly, 331 N.W.2d 203 (1982) is a US contract law case decided by the Supreme Court of Michigan. It used a risk of loss analysis to justify the denial of rescission as a contract remedy despite the presence of mutual mistake.

Facts
The Pickles bought a  three unit dwelling for use as a rental property from the Messerly's, only to discover that an illegal septic tank had contaminated the ground. 

Raw sewage was seeping out of the ground. Lenawee County condemned the property making it worthless to the buying party Pickles. So, Pickles sought rescission and Messerly sought a deficiency judgment.

Judgment
The Supreme Court of Michigan backed away from the precedent of Sherwood v. Walker in favor of the Restatement (Second) of Contracts, and relied on an "as is" clause in the land contract to deny rescission.

See also
US contract law
Toxic asset

Notes

References

External links

United States contract case law
1982 in United States case law
Michigan state case law
1982 in Michigan